The Taurobolic Altar is an inscribed ancient Roman altar found in 1704 in a vineyard belonging to a certain Bourgeat on the Fourvière hill in Lyon, France. It dates to the year 160 and refers to a taurobolium carried out in Lugdunum to Cybele for the restoration of the emperor Antoninus Pius's health. It is now held at the Gallo-Roman Museum of Lyon.

Roman Lyon

Roman altars
Archaeological artifacts
Religion in the Roman Empire
5th arrondissement of Lyon
Buildings and structures in Lyon
Religion in Lyon